Aurélien Paret-Peintre (born 27 February 1996 in Annemasse) is a French cyclist, who currently rides for UCI WorldTeam . In October 2020, he was named in the startlist for the 2020 Giro d'Italia.

Major results

2014
 1st  Overall Tour of Istria
1st Stage 1
2015
 4th Road race, National Under-23 Road Championships
 4th Overall Kreiz Breizh Elites
 6th Overall Ronde de l'Isard
2016
 8th Liège–Bastogne–Liège Espoirs
2017
 4th Piccolo Giro di Lombardia
 5th Trofeo Edil C
 10th Liège–Bastogne–Liège Espoirs
2018
 2nd Overall Ronde de l'Isard
 7th Overall Grand Prix Priessnitz spa
2019
 4th Boucles de l'Aulne
 5th Polynormande
 10th Overall Tour de Wallonie
2020
 3rd Tour du Doubs
 6th Overall Étoile de Bessèges
 10th Overall Tour de Luxembourg
2021
 1st Grand Prix La Marseillaise
 2nd Mercan'Tour Classic Alpes-Maritimes 
 7th Classic Sud-Ardèche
 9th Overall Paris–Nice
 10th Overall Tour Poitou-Charentes en Nouvelle-Aquitaine
 10th Tre Valli Varesine
2022
 8th Overall Tour de la Provence
 10th Overall Paris–Nice
 10th Overall Tour Poitou-Charentes en Nouvelle-Aquitaine
2023
 2nd Overall Tour des Alpes-Maritimes et du Var
1st Stage 3

Grand Tour general classification results timeline

References

External links

1996 births
Living people
French male cyclists
Sportspeople from Haute-Savoie
People from Annemasse
Cyclists from Auvergne-Rhône-Alpes